Brad D. Strawn is an American psychologist and theologian, currently the Evelyn and Frank Freed Professor of the Integration of Psychology and Theology at Fuller Theological Seminary.

References

Year of birth missing (living people)
Living people
Fuller Theological Seminary faculty
American theologians
Fuller Theological Seminary alumni
Point Loma Nazarene University alumni